Bugeac is a commune and village in the Gagauz Autonomous Territorial Unit of the Republic of Moldova.  The 2004 census listed the commune as having a population of 1,525 people.  942 inhabitants are Gagauz. Minorities included 115 Russians, 85 Ukrainians, 56 Bulgarians, 4 Roma and 305 Moldovans.  Bugeac's average elevation is 43 metres.

Its geographical coordinates are 46° 21' 57" North, 28° 39' 48" East.

References

Besghioz